Olearia oporina, commonly known as tētēaweka,  keketerehe, and tūpare (from Māori), is a species of small tree or shrub in the family Asteraceae.

References 

oporina